Ernest Deighton Mottley CBE (11 May 1907 – 27 April 1973) was a Barbadian politician, leader of the Barbados National Party, and first mayor of Bridgetown (1959).
He was a member of the House of Assembly of Barbados from 1946 to 1971.

He was friends with Errol Barrow, though after the election of 1961, Mottley became Leader of the Opposition to Barrow's Barbados Labour Party government.

In 1962, Mottley was honoured as an Ordinary Commander of the Civil Division of the Most Excellent Order of the British Empire (CBE) for public services in Barbados.

His granddaughter, Mia Mottley, became the first woman Prime Minister of Barbados in 2018.

References 

1907 births
1973 deaths
20th-century Barbadian politicians
Commanders of the Order of the British Empire